Donald Humphrey Stonesifer (January 29, 1927 – October 15, 2021) was an American football wide receiver who played six seasons in the National Football League.

References

1927 births
2021 deaths
American football wide receivers
Northwestern Wildcats football players
Chicago Cardinals players
Players of American football from Chicago